The 2022 USL W League season is the first season of USL W League.

The regular season began on May 6 and ended on July 10. 44 teams participated in this inaugural season.

Indy Eleven won the first game in league history, defeating Kings Hammer FC 3–1 on May 6. Rachel McCarthy scored the first two goals.

South Georgia Tormenta FC won the Championship 2–1 against Regular Season winners Minnesota Aurora FC on July 23.

Standings

Metropolitan Division

Mid Atlantic Division

Great Lakes Division

Heartland Division

South Atlantic Division

South Central Division

Southeast Division

Playoffs

Bracket

Quarterfinals

Semifinals

W League Championship 

Championship MVP: Sydney Martinez (TRM)

Awards

All-League Teams

First Team
F: Amy Andrews (TRM), Katie Soderstrom (IND), Mia Asenjo (QFC)
M: Christian Brathwaite (GVL), Treva Aycock (SSA), Nicole Waters (WAK)
D: Kenzie Langdok (MNA), Robyn McCarthy (IND), Barbara Murillo (FMC), Nina Carlomusto (LIR)
G: Sydney Martinez (TRM)

Second Team
F: Maddy Williams (IND), Bailey Korhorn (KAL), Aleigh Gambone (MCL)
M: Caroline Conti (GVL), Jaida Nyby (TRM), Lauren Wrigley (MOR)
D: Kelsey Kaufusi (MNA), Abby Wolf (TRM), Emily Madril (LOU), Maggie Shaw (CHT)
G: Sarah Fuller (MNA)

References

External links
 USL League Two website

2022 in American soccer leagues